Robert Szpak (born 31 December 1989 in Kołobrzeg) is a Polish athlete, who specialises in the javelin throw. He represented Poland at the 2008 World Junior Championships in Bydgoszcz, Poland and took the gold medal in the javelin with a personal best throw of 78.01 metres. He achieved a new personal best of 78.33 m in June 2009 in Ostrava.

Personal bests

External links

1989 births
Living people
People from Kołobrzeg
Polish male javelin throwers
Sportspeople from West Pomeranian Voivodeship
Zawisza Bydgoszcz athletes